Razq (also Romanized as Razq, Rāzak, Razg, and Razk; also known as Rezq-e Soleymān) is a village in Naharjan Rural District, Mud District, Sarbisheh County, South Khorasan Province, Iran. At the 2006 census, its population was 191, in 71 families.

References 

Populated places in Sarbisheh County